Kanagarthi may refer to any of the following villages in Telangana, India:

 Kanagarthi, Karimnagar district
 Kanagarthi, Peddapalli district
 Kanagarthi, Rajanna Sircilla district